The Medley Rocks are a group of reefs and rocks lying close off the northeast side of D'Urville Island, in the Joinville Island group, Antarctica. They were surveyed by the Falkland Islands Dependencies Survey in 1953–54, and were so named in 1956 because of the "medley" of reefs and rocks in this area.

References

Reefs of Graham Land
Landforms of the Joinville Island group